Farashian (also Romanized as Farāshīān, Farashiyan, Farrāshīyān, and Farrāshyān; also known as Farasīāh) is a village in Pain Jovin Rural District, Helali District, Joghatai County, Razavi Khorasan Province, Iran. At the 2006 census, its population was 2,020, in 472 families.

References 

Populated places in Joghatai County